New Urban High School (NUHS) is a public school located in Oak Grove, Oregon, United States.

Academics
In 2008, 40% of the school's seniors received a high school diploma. Of 68 students, 27 graduated, 15 dropped out, and 26 were still in high school the following year.

References

External links
 New Urban High School (official website)
 School report card (2005)
 School Report Card (2016)

Educational institutions established in 2003
Milwaukie, Oregon
High schools in Clackamas County, Oregon
Public high schools in Oregon
2003 establishments in Oregon